The Highland Community School District is a rural public school district headquartered in unincorporated Washington County, Iowa, that serves much of eastern Washington County and a small portion of southern Johnson County, including Riverside, Ainsworth, and surrounding rural areas.

The high school and middle school are connected in one building, also housing the district headquarters, located between Riverside and Ainsworth in an unincorporated area in Washington County. The elementary school is located in Riverside.

History
The district was formed in 1963 as the consolidation of Riverside and Ainsworth schools.

In 2018, the Lone Tree Community School District administration announced that the district will begin sharing a superintendent with the Highland district.

Schools

Highland Elementary School
Located in Riverside, Highland Elementary is the district's sole elementary school, housing grades Kindergarten through fifth.  The school also provides a preschool program for children ages four and five.  Formerly known as Riverside Elementary, the school was renamed Highland Elementary in 2017 when Ainsworth Elementary closed and all elementary-aged students in the district consolidated into one school.

Highland Middle School
Highland Middle School is the single middle school in the district. The school opened in the fall of 2003, with one addition and remodeling project since.  It is connected to Highland High School. It is located in the rural area between Riverside and Ainsworth at 1715 Vine Avenue. The school serves grades 6 through 8.

Highland High School
Highland High School, the sole high school in the district, serves grades 9 through 12. The building was built in 1965, with renovations and additions since then. A connection to the middle school allows the sharing of some courses between schools. It is currently a 1A school in athletics and extracurricular activities.

Athletics
The Huskies compete in the Southeast Iowa Superconference in the following sports:
Cross Country
Volleyball
Football
Wrestling
Basketball
Bowling
Track and Field
Golf
Soccer
Baseball
Softball
 2007 Class 1A State Champions

Former Schools 
From 1963 to 2017, the district operated two elementary schools.  One school was located in Ainsworth with the other located in Riverside.

The most recent Ainsworth Elementary building was constructed in 1973 and received renovations and an expansion in 1999. Circa 2001 it had about 120 students. Due to declining enrollment and increased costs, the Highland Board of Education made the decision to close the Ainsworth school at the conclusion of the 2016-2017 school year.  Starting the fall of 2017, all elementary students in the district began to attend school in Riverside, which was renamed Highland Elementary. In 2017 Ainsworth Elementary had 70 students. District leadership stated that it would have had to spend upkeep of $50,000 if it remained open.

Prior to the opening of the middle school in 2003, seventh through twelfth grade students in the district attended the Highland Junior-Senior High School, which was located at the current-day high school site.  Sixth grade students attended either Ainsworth or Riverside Elementary School.

See also
List of school districts in Iowa
List of high schools in Iowa

References

External links
 Highland Community School District website
 
 City of Riverside website

School districts in Iowa
Education in Washington County, Iowa
Education in Johnson County, Iowa
School districts established in 1963
1963 establishments in Iowa